Yolki 7 (meaning The Last Christmas Trees) is a Russian comedy film, which is the seventh in the "Yolki" franchise, not counting the spin-off "Paws, Bones & Rock'n'roll" (2014). It premiered on December 27, 2018. The seventh film premiered on December 27, 2018. Yolki 7 received mixed reviews, which were lower than the previous film. Despite the title, Yolki 8, a sequel to the seventh film, was released in 2021.

Plot 
The film illustrates the new adventures of the heroes of the famous franchise on the eve of the New Year. The Snow Maiden rescues a lonely grandfather; The hipster from Tyumen helps Uncle Yura correctly make an offer to his lover; Boris does everything possible to make his friend Zhenya to not return to Yakutia; Perm sportsmen dream to see the smile of a beautiful girl and they are ready to put on the ears of the whole city, and an ordinary resident of Voronezh goes to the capital to meet the man of his dreams - actor named Komarovsky.

Cast 
Ivan Urgant - Boris Vorobyov
Sergey Svetlakov - Evgeniy
Dmitry Nagiyev - Yury Semyonovich Vnukov

References

Bazelevs Company films
Films directed by Dmitriy Kiselev
Films directed by Alexander Kott
2018 films
2018 comedy films
Russian comedy films
Films set around New Year
Russian anthology films
Russian sequel films